FC SKA-Khabarovsk-2 is a Russian football team based in Khabarovsk. It is the reserves team for FC SKA-Khabarovsk.

Club history
It played on amateur levels throughout its existence, before getting licensed for the third-tier Russian FNL 2 for the 2021–22 season.

Current squad
As of 21 February 2023, according to the Second League website.

References

 
Association football clubs established in 1999
Football clubs in Russia
Sport in Khabarovsk
1999 establishments in Russia